Śāriputra (c. 1335-1426 CE) was a 14th- and 15th-century Indian Buddhist monk and the last known abbot of the Bodh Gaya mahavihara in Bihar, India prior to its restoration in the 19th century. After he left Bodh Gaya, Sariputra subsequently travelled to Nepal, Tibet and China.

Among his activities include the restoration of the Swayambhunath caitya in Kathmandu. Following this, he spent some time in Tibet where he helped to establish tantric lineages that had originated in India. 
He is considered among the last known pre-modern Buddhist figures in India along with Buddhaguptanatha. What we know of Sariputra's life is recorded in his Tibetan and Chinese biographies.

Abbot of Bodh Gaya
Sariputra seems to have been born in a Buddhist family somewhere in East India. At a young age, he made the decision to travel westwards to Bodh Gaya. As the abbot of the Bodh Gaya monastery, Sariputra was responsible for the restoration of various buildings and monuments around the site of the Mahabodhi temple. During this period, many Burmese pilgrims visited Bodh Gaya who also help to fund the restoration of these religious sites. Prior to this, the upper half of the Mahabodhi's gandola had been destroyed by Turuskas. He also received royal patronage from a local King after preaching Buddhism to him. After many years serving as the abbot of Bodh Gaya, Sariputra decided to travel northwards to Nepal.

Travels

Nepal
When Sariputra traveled to Nepal, he noted that the Buddhist site of Swayambhunath caitya which he worshipped at was in bad condition and suggested to the local King who belonged to the Malla dynasty, that it should be restored. It has been suggested that during this period he lived in Bhaktapur.

Tibet
Sariputra was said to have visited Tibet around 1418 while Bdag Chen. From Sariputra, this ruler was said to have received initiations into various tantric lineages including Kalachakra tantra and he was listed as one of the king's main spiritual advisors. Tibetan sources also detail that he consecrated a bridge in Lcang ra in 1418. Aside from this, little else is known about his activities in Tibet.

China
 
Following his stay in Tibet, Sariputra was subsequently invited to China, where he arrived with Hou Xian, who was sent to Tibet to collect him on behalf of the Ming dynasty. Sariputra arrived in Beijing, where he met the Yongle Emperor. The exact date of when he met with the Yongle Emperor is not known for certain, but most estimates place it around the early 15th century. During this time, Sariputra was provided with residence in Haiyin monastery. Sariputra was also present during the ascension of Hongxi Emperor to the throne in 1425. 

As per his biography, Sariputra seems to have spent most of his time in China in Beijing. 
He was responsible for providing the design of the Zhenjue Temple which itself is a replica of the Mahabodhi temple. He is also said to have brought with him five Golden Buddha statues which as per legend are buried under the temple under each pagoda.

References

Indian Buddhist missionaries
Indian Buddhist monks
1330s births
1426 deaths
Year of birth uncertain
14th-century Buddhist monks
15th-century Buddhist monks